Melanocetus eustalus is a deep sea anglerfish in the family Melanocetidae, found off the Pacific coast of Mexico at depths down to about .

References

Melanocetidae
Deep sea fish
Fish described in 1980
Taxa named by Theodore Wells Pietsch III